Agladrillia is a genus of sea snails, marine gastropod mollusks in the family Drilliidae.

Description
A specific characteristic for this genus is that the outer lip is strongly drawn in towards the base.

Species
Species within the genus Agladrillia include:
 Agladrillia anadelgado Rolán et al., 2007
 Agladrillia aureola Fallon, 2016
 Agladrillia badia McLean & Poorman, 1971
 Agladrillia benjamini (Bartsch, 1915)
 † Agladrillia callothyra Woodring, 1928 
 Agladrillia flucticulus McLean & Poorman, 1971
 Agladrillia fuegiensis (Smith E. A., 1888)
 Agladrillia gorgonensis McLean & Poorman, 1971
 Agladrillia macella (Melvill, 1923)
 Agladrillia nitens (Hinds, 1843)
 Agladrillia piscorum Kilburn, 1988
 Agladrillia plicatella (Dall, 1908)
 Agladrillia pudica (Hinds, 1843)
 Agladrillia rhodochroa (Dautzenberg, 1900)
 Agladrillia serra Woodring, 1928
 Agladrillia torquata Fallon, 2016
 Agladrillia ukuminxa Kilburn, 1988
Species brought into synonymy
 † Agladrillia oyamai Shuto, 1965: synonym of † Thelecytharella oyamai (Shuto, 1965), synonym of Otitoma oyamai (Shuto, 1965)

References

 Woodring, W. P. 1928. Contributions to the geology and paleontology of the West Indies: Miocene molluscs from Bowden, Jamaica. Part 2. Carnegie Inst. Washington 385: 144-201

External links
 WMSDB - Worldwide Mollusc Species Data Base: family Drilliidae

 
Drilliidae